Southeast Webster Community School District was a school district in Iowa.

Communities served include Burnside, Dayton, Harcourt, and Lehigh. It operated Burnside Elementary School, Dayton Elementary School, Southeast Webster Middle School, and Southeast Webster High School.  it had about 600 students. The district's mascot was the eagle.

History
It formed on July 1, 1991, with the merger of the Central Webster Community School District and the Dayton Community School District. On July 1, 2005, it merged with the Grand Community School District to form the Southeast Webster-Grand Community School District.

References

External links
 

Defunct school districts in Iowa
1991 establishments in Iowa
School districts established in 1991
2005 disestablishments in Iowa
School districts disestablished in 2005